The United Church Schools Trust (UCST) is a large education charity in the United Kingdom which owns and operates a group of 12 private schools. The charity is operating under the name United Learning as of 2012.

History
UCST was founded in 1883 (as the ‘Church Schools Company’) to extend the reach of academic education in Victorian England and to educate young women based on Christian (and particularly Anglican) principles. The majority of its schools are now co-educational. As a group, it is non-denominational and welcomes pupils of all faiths and none to its schools.

In 2002, it established the United Learning Trust (now United Learning) as a fully owned subsidiary to extend UCST’s work and ethos into the state sector through the Academies Programme. Together, UCST schools and ULT academies educate more than 30,000 pupils.
   
UCST is one of the 100 largest UK charitable organisations. Its central office is based in Peterborough, Cambridgeshire. It is governed by a Board of Trustees and an Executive Team.

Schools
UCST currently owns and manages 12 independent schools across England:
 AKS Lytham
 Ashford School
 Caterham School
 Dunottar School, Reigate
 Embley
 Greenacre School
 Guildford High School
 Tranby School
 Lincoln Minster School
 Rowan Preparatory School
 St Ives School for Girls
 Surbiton High School

Five schools are boarding and day; seven schools are day only. Five schools are single-sex (girls); nine schools are co-educational. The schools are accredited through the Independent Schools Council (ISC).

The UCST planned to merge King Edward VII and Queen Mary School (KEQMS) with Arnold School in September 2012, to create Arnold KEQMS (now AKS Lytham). A parent group lodged an appeal with HM Courts and Tribunal Service – First Tier Tribunal on Friday 9 December 2011. The appeal was heard on 11 & 12 April 2012 and a decision was released by the tribunal on 17 May 2012 stating that the merger can proceed; however, the lease granted to UCST does not adequately protect the assets of the Lytham Schools and will therefore need to be re-written. The parents group have since announced that they will not be appealing this decision and the merger will therefore go ahead.

Academies

UCST's subsidiary charity the United Learning Trust operates 60 academies and one City Technology College.

United Learning
In 2012 ULT and UCST rebranded to operate under one name, United Learning. They legally remain as two separate charities.

References

External links
 

1883 establishments in the United Kingdom
Charities based in Northamptonshire
Educational charities based in the United Kingdom